Gardenia is a genus of about 250 species of flowering plants

Gardenia may also refer to:

Arts, entertainment, and media

Fictional entities
 Gardenia (Pokémon), a character in Pokémon Diamond and Pearl
 Gardenia, a fictional city from the popular TV show Winx Club

Music 
 "Gardenia" (Iggy Pop song), 2016
 "Gardenia" (Kyuss song), 1995
 Gardenia (album), 2021 by Monogem
 "Gardenia", a song by Malice Mizer
 "Gardenia", a song by Mandy Moore, from the album Wild Hope
 "Gardenia", a song by Stephen Malkmus and the Jicks, from the album Real Emotional Trash

Other arts, entertainment, and media
 Gardenia (film), a 1979 film starring Martin Balsam
 Gardenia, a play by John Guare

Other uses
 Gardenia, Belize, a village in the Belize District
 Gardenia Foods, a Singaporean baked-goods company
  - a number of motor vessels named Gardenia
 Vincent Gardenia (1920–1992), Italian-American actor of stage, film, and television

See also 
 Gardena (disambiguation)
 Gardenian, a Swedish band